Armstrong Beach is a coastal town and a locality in the Mackay Region, Queensland, Australia.

Geography
The waters of the Coral Sea form the eastern boundary.

History 
The locality was mistakenly named and bounded on 4 June 1999 as Armstrong Creek but was corrected on 19 November 1999 to be Armstrong Beach.

Education 
There are no schools in Armstrong Beach. The nearest government primary and secondary schools are Sarina State School and Sarina State High School, both in neighbouring Sarina to the west.

References

External links 
 

Towns in Queensland
Mackay Region
Coastline of Queensland
Localities in Queensland